The 1934 Dixie Rebels football team was an American football team that represented Dixie University (affiliated with Somerville School of Law) during the 1934 college football season. In its second and final season of college football, Dixie compiled a record of 0–7, managing to score just two touchdowns during the entire season. With the departure of head coach Nick Dobbs toward the end of the 1933 season, the Dixie football program floundered, and after the end of the 1934 season, the team was disbanded and never played another game.  Dixie University itself closed, too, albeit without any formal notification, as all references to Dixie vanished by 1935.

Schedule

References

Dixie
Dixie Rebels football seasons
College football winless seasons
Dixie Rebels football